Paris Still Sings (French: Paris chante toujours) is a 1951 French musical comedy film directed by Pierre Montazel and starring Lucien Baroux, Clément Duhour and Madeleine Lebeau with performances from a large number of leading French singers.

Cast
 Les Compagnons de la Chanson  Themselves / En personne  
 André Dassary as himself / En personne  
 Georges Guétary as himself / En personne  
 Luis Mariano as himself / En personne  
 Yves Montand as himself / En personne  
 Édith Piaf as herself / En personne  
 Line Renaud as herself / En personne  
 Tino Rossi as himself / En personne  
 Jean Sablon as himself / En personne  
 Georges Ulmer as himself / En personne  
 Angelvin 
 Frédéric Bart 
 Léon Belières as Le président des vieux comédiens  
 Michel de Bonnay 
 Charles Camus 
 Christine Carère as La partenaire de Tino Rossi  
 Christine Chesnay as La femme blonde  
 Jean Clarieux 
 Marguerite Deval 
 Denis d'Inès as Le maître d'hôtel  
 Pierre Magnier 
 Maryse Martin as La concierge  
 Marcel Melrac as Un policier  
 Frédéric O'Brady as Le concierge  
 Philippe Olive as Le ministre  
 Jean Ozenne as Le partenaire de Line Renaud  
 Janine Marsay 
 Van Doude 
 Lucien Baroux as Clodomir  
 Clément Duhour as Gilbert  
 Madeleine Lebeau as Gisèle  
 Perrette Souplex as Pierrette 
 Raymond Souplex as himself / En personne  
 Les Petites poulbots de Montmartre as Themselves / En personne  
 Les Pensionnaires de la maison de retraite de Ris Orangis as Themselves / En personne 
 Henri Cote 
 Arthur Devère as Le commissaire  
 Guy Henry 
 Jacqueline Joubert 
 Yvonne Legeay 
 Fred Mella as himself / En personne 
 Albert Michel as Un agent  
 Geneviève Morel as La femme de Raoul  
 Evelyn Nattier 
 Jean-Claude Rameau
 Edouard Rousseau

References

Bibliography 
 Simon Frith. Popular Music: Critical Concepts in Media and Cultural Studies, Volume 2. Psychology Press, 2004.

External links 
 

1951 films
1951 musical comedy films
French musical comedy films
1950s French-language films
Films directed by Pierre Montazel
Films set in Paris
French black-and-white films
1950s French films